Wilbur E. Colyer (March 5, 1898 – October 10, 1918) was an American soldier serving in the U.S. Army during World War I who received the Medal of Honor for bravery.

Biography
Colyer was born March 5, 1898, in Brooklyn, New York and after enlisting in the Army in 1917 was sent to France to fight in World War I.
He died October 10, 1918, and is buried in Cypress Hills National Cemetery, Brooklyn, New York.

Medal of Honor citation

Rank and organization: Sergeant, U.S. Army, Company A, 1st Engineers, 1st Division. Place and date: Near Verdun, France, 9 October 1918. Entered service at: South Ozone Park, Long Island, N.Y. Birth: Brooklyn, N.Y. General Orders: War Department, General Orders No. 20 (January 30, 1919).

Citation:
Volunteering with 2 other soldiers to locate machinegun nests, Sgt. Colyer advanced on the hostile positions to a point where he was half surrounded by the nests, which were in ambush. He killed the gunner of one gun with a captured German grenade and then turned this gun on the other nests silencing all of them before he returned to his platoon. He was later killed in action.

Remembrance
On October 9, 2013, the 1st Engineer Battalion hosted a "mud run," modeled after the popular Tough Mudder, that included ruck marching, an obstacle course, and a crawl through a muddy pit. The course was named the "SGT Wilbur E. Colyer Diehard Challenge" in memory of SGT Colyer.

Military awards 
Colyer's military decorations and awards include:

See also

List of Medal of Honor recipients for World War I

References

1898 births
1918 deaths
United States Army Medal of Honor recipients
United States Army soldiers
People from Brooklyn
American military personnel killed in World War I
World War I recipients of the Medal of Honor
Burials at Cypress Hills National Cemetery
Military personnel from New York (state)